The Côte Bleue (Provençal Occitan: Còsta Blava; English: "Blue Coast") is part of Provence's southwestern coast on the Mediterranean Sea, reaching from northern Marseille in the east to the early Rhône river delta in the west, which constitutes the eastern part of the Camargue natural region, west of the Étang de Berre. It is wholly within the Bouches-du-Rhône department in Southern France.

Transport
The Côte Bleue is served by the SNCF railway running from Miramas to the L'Estaque neighbourhood in northern Marseille, through the seaside communes of Sausset-les-Pins, Carry-le-Rouet, Ensuès-la-Redonne and Le Rove. Opened in phases between 1879 and 1915, it has been named one of the most scenic railway lines in the world. It is colloquially known in French as Le train de la côte Bleue ("The train of the Blue Coast").

References

Seaside resorts in France
Bleue
Landforms of Provence-Alpes-Côte d'Azur